Folliculogenesis-specific basic helix-loop-helix, also known as factor in the germline alpha (FIGalpha) or transcription factor FIGa, is a protein that in humans is encoded by the FIGLA gene. The FIGLA gene is a germ cell-specific transcription factor preferentially expressed in oocytes that can be found on human chromosome 2p13.3.

Function 

This gene encodes a protein that functions in postnatal oocyte-specific gene expression. The protein is a basic helix-loop-helix transcription factor that regulates multiple oocyte-specific genes, including genes involved in folliculogenesis, oocyte differentiation, and those that encode the zona pellucida. FIGLA is related to the zona pellucida genes ZP1, ZP2, and ZP3.

Clinical significance 

Mutation in the FIGLA gene are associated with premature ovarian failure. Premature ovarian failure is a genetic disorder that leads to hypergonadotropic ovarian failure and infertility. It is believed that premature ovarian failure in humans is caused by FIGLA haploninsuffciency, which disrupts the formation of the primordial follicles. This was observed in FIGLA mice knockouts which had diminished follicular endowment and accelerated oocyte loss throughout their reproductive life span. Women with mutations in their FIGLA were shown to have a form of premature ovarian failure. As well as the failure to form primordial follicles, knockout mice also lacked zona pellucida genes Zp1, Zp2, and ZP3 expression.

References

Further reading 

 
 
 
 
 
 
 

Transcription factors